Yassine Jaber is a liberal Shia member of parliament in Lebanon. He has represented the Nabatiyeh district in South Lebanon since the first post Lebanese Civil War election in 1992. He is an independent candidate but is affiliated with the Liberation and Development bloc led by Amal Movement head and Parliamentary Speaker Nabih Berri. In the May 2018 elections, Jaber won 7,920 preferential votes under a newly instituted, hybrid voting system that put him at the 71st place out of 515 total candidates across the country.

Biography 
Yasin Kamel Jaber was born in Nabatiyeh in 1951. After graduating with a BA in Business Administration from the American University of Beirut in 1973, Jaber founded a financial company in the capitol and worked there until the beginning of the Lebanese Civil War in 1975. Although he spent 1976-1978 abroad, working mainly in Saudi Arabia, Africa, Britain and Los Angeles in the contracting and international trade sectors, Jaber soon returned to Lebanon in order to launch several real estate, tourism and hotel projects in Beirut. From 1981, while still managing his projects in Lebanon, he primarily resided in London where he was a member of the Board of Directors of the British-Lebanese Friendship Society and a member of the Advisory Council of the Arab Community in Britain.

Shortly after the end of the Lebanese Civil War in 1990, Jaber ran and won a seat in the new Parliamentary elections, held in 1992. In 1993, he was appointed to the Board of Directors of Casino Du Lebanon and in 1994 became a member of the re-launched Beirut Stock Exchange Committee.

Appointed Minister of Economy from 1996 to 1998, he was part of the Rafik Hariri Government avidly engaged in the reconstruction of Lebanon. In his post, he was also the first Lebanese Minister of Economy to consider the social and psychological costs of war and promote peace through economic development. Continuing in the tradition of Lebanese leaders committed to free commerce, Jaber strongly advocated for free trade with the United States and other countries.

In 2016, as chairman of the Foreign Affairs and Expatriates Committee, Jaber introduced several landmark bills that aim to set up a national oil company to manage Lebanon's nascent energy sector and create a special petroleum revenue directorate at the Finance Ministry. Notably, Jaber's approach is geared toward saving the country's newfound wealth rather than paying down Lebanon's heavy debt burden or investing in infrastructure. "The easiest option would be to say, 'Yeah, we have oil money coming in and we will just take it and continue like we’re doing.'" 

Jaber also became a leading voice in Lebanon arguing for expanding the capacities of elected officials and institutions, launching a series of training workshops for the staffers of the Lebanese Parliament in partnership with the European Union. The effort seeks to broaden ICT techniques, legislative drafting and legal scrutiny, etiquettes and protocol techniques, budget analysis for researchers, as well as training for media reporters accredited to the Parliament.

Considered a liberal politician, Jaber is a vocal support of human rights through equitable economic development in other countries such as South Africa 

He is currently married to Wafaa Mohamed Al Ali, and has four children: Kamel, Sara, Tamara and Naêl.

See also
 Lebanese Parliament
 Members of the 2009-2013 Lebanese Parliament

References

Official Website
 

Living people
Members of the Parliament of Lebanon
Lebanese Shia Muslims
Year of birth missing (living people)
Amal Movement politicians
Economy and Trade ministers of Lebanon